Edmond Doutté (14 January 1867 – 6 August 1926) was a French sociologist, orientalist and Islamologist - both Arabist and Berberologist - but also an explorer of Maghreb.

Works 
1900: 
1900: 
1900: L'Islâm algérien en l'an 1900. Algiers: Giralt.
1900: Les Aissaoua à Tlemcen, Ed. Châlons-sur-Marne.
1905: Merrâkech. Paris : Comité du Maroc.
1905: La Khot’ba burlesque de la fête des Tolba au Maroc, in: Recueil de mémoires et de textes publiés en l’honneur du XIVe Congrès des Orientalistes, Algiers: Fontana.
1909: Magie et religion dans l'Afrique du Nord. Algiers: Âdolphe Jourdan,(La Societe Musulmane du Maghrib) 
1914:  En tribu. Missions au Maroc. Paris: Paul Geuthner.
1919: Imroulcaïs, Arabic play in three acts. Cowritten with Fernand Nozière. Music by Camille Erlanger. Premiered at the Théâtre Sarah-Bernhardt, 18 February 1919, by Romuald Joubé (Imroulcaïs) and Ida Rubinstein (Oum Djondab).

Bibliography 

 , 1 p. and 15 doc. 
 , nouvelle série, vol.2, p. 6-7 Read online (rééd. dans .
 .
 .
 .
  online.
 .

External links 
 Edmond Doutté on Académie des sciences d'outre-mer
 Lettre de M. Edmond Doutté, chargé de mission au Maroc on Persée

1867 births
People from Évreux
1926 deaths
French ethnographers
French Arabists
French explorers
20th-century explorers
French scholars of Islam
Chevaliers of the Légion d'honneur
Berberologists